President Super Star is a 2019 Sri Lankan Sinhala political comedy film directed and produced by Udayakantha Warnasuriya for U Creations. It stars ensemble cast of veteran and young artists including Isuru Lokuhettiarachchi in lead role along with Mahendra Perera, Sriyantha Mendis, Gihan Fernando, Priyantha Seneviratne and Srimal Wedisinghe in supportive roles. Music composed by Mahesh Denipitiya.

The film received mixed reviews from critics. However, the film was a box-office bomb and failed to earn the production charges.

Plot

Cast

Main cast
 Srimal Wedisinghe as Kelum Devasurendra	
 Isuru Lokuhettiarachchi as Asela Ranaweera	 	
 Mahendra Perera as Vijitha Mapalagama		
 Sriyantha Mendis as Dasharaj Dharmapala	
 Priyantha Seneviratne as Priyantha Alawirathna 
 Gihan Fernando as Program host		
 Ajith Weerasinghe as Jagath Saparamadu	 	
 Tharindi Fernando as Dilanka, Asela's wife

Supportive cast
 W. Jayasiri as Minister		
 Pubudu Chathuranga as Lichchawi King		
 Roshan Ranawana as Lichchawi King		
 Anuj Ranasinghe as Lichchawi King		
 Sanath Gunathilake as Judge Daham Daranagama		
 Ashan Dias as Mad president		
 Gayathri Dias as Kelum's wife 	
 Wilson Gunaratne as J.R. Jayawardena dummy		
 Rathna Lalani Jayakody as Samanthika		
 Janaka Kumbukage as ISIS leader
 Sampath Tennakoon as Janadhipathi
 Sarath Chandrasiri as Police media spokesman	
 Jayalal Rohana as Reporter		
 Ananda Wickramage	as Program coordinator	
 Lal Kularatne as Reporter
 Shyam Fernando as Lawyer		
 Bimal Jayakody as Lawyer		
 Richard Manamudali as Reporter
 Saman Hemarathna as Reporter		
 Sando Harris as Film director		
 Sampath Jayaweera as Police inspector 	
 Suranga Satharasinghe as Reporter
 Sarath Kulanga as Journalist

Multiple roles playing cast
 Dharmapriya Dias 
 Lucky Dias		
 Giriraj Kaushalya 
 Palitha Silva 	
 Mihira Sirithilaka 
 Nilmini Tennakoon		
 Kumara Thirimadura 
 Rodney Warnakula 
 Ravindra Yasas 
 Ariyasena Gamage 
 Hemantha Iriyagama		
 Anura Bandara Rajaguru		
 Chathura Perera 
 Buddhika Rambukwella		
 Jeevan Handunnetti 
 Saman Almeida 
 Dimuthu Chinthaka
 Boniface Jayasantha 
 Wasantha Wittachchi		
 Kumari Senaratne		
 Kumara Wanduressa		
 Harry Wimalasena		
 Sajeewa Malmala Arachchi		
 Vasantha Vittachchi
 Teena Shanell Fernando in item song

Songs

References

External links
 
 President Super Star on YouTube

2010s Sinhala-language films
2019 films
Films directed by Udayakantha Warnasuriya